Frode Olsen (born 12 October 1967) is a Norwegian former professional footballer who played as a goalkeeper. He earned 26 international caps for the Norway national team.

During his career he played for clubs like Viking F.K., Stabæk IF, IK Start and Sevilla FC. He won the Kniksen award as goalie of the year three years in a row from 1997 to 1999.

After retirement, he coached the Klepp IL women's team, then he commentated Spanish football on the Norwegian TV channel TV 2. After TV 2 lost the broadcasting contract for Spanish football, he began working as a studio analyst covering Tippeligaen. While being employed at TV 2, he was the sports director of Bryne FK between January and September 2008.

His favorite English team is Luton Town.

He has also qualified as a referee, officiating on games in Youth Football local to Stavanger from May 2011.

References

Living people
1967 births
Sportspeople from Stavanger
Norwegian footballers
Association football goalkeepers
Norway international footballers
UEFA Euro 2000 players
Kniksen Award winners
Eliteserien players
La Liga players
Rosenborg BK players
Strømsgodset Toppfotball players
IK Start players
Stabæk Fotball players
Viking FK players
Sevilla FC players
Norwegian expatriate footballers
Norwegian expatriate sportspeople in Spain
Expatriate footballers in Spain
Norwegian association football commentators